A by-election was held for the New South Wales Legislative Assembly electorate of Waverley on 20 February 1896 because of the death of Angus Cameron. This was the final election contested by Sir Henry Parkes.

Dates

Result

				
				

Angus Cameron died.

See also
Electoral results for the district of Waverley
List of New South Wales state by-elections

Notes

References

1896 elections in Australia
New South Wales state by-elections
1890s in New South Wales